Shrimp and prawn are types of seafood that are consumed worldwide. Although shrimp and prawns belong to different suborders of Decapoda, they are very similar in appearance and the terms are often used interchangeably in commercial farming and wild fisheries. A distinction is drawn in recent aquaculture literature, which increasingly uses the term "prawn" only for the freshwater forms of palaemonids and "shrimp" for the marine penaeids.

In the United Kingdom, the word "prawn" is more common on menus than "shrimp"; the opposite is the case in North America. The term "prawn" is also loosely used for any large shrimp, especially those that come 15 (or fewer) to the pound (such as "king prawns", yet sometimes known as "jumbo shrimp"). Australia and some other Commonwealth nations follow this British usage to an even greater extent, using the word "prawn" almost exclusively. When Australian comedian Paul Hogan used the phrase, "I'll slip an extra shrimp on the barbie for you" in an American television advertisement, it was intended to make what he was saying easier for his American audience to understand, and was thus a deliberate distortion of what an Australian would typically say. In Britain very small crustaceans with a brownish shell are called shrimp, and are used to make potted shrimps. They are also used in dishes where they are not the primary ingredient. The French term  is often encountered in restaurants.

Shrimp and other shellfish are among the most common food allergens. Indeed, it is probably for this reason that the major religions of the world today find dietary rules woven into their mythology that expressly warn against eating these food items. For example, the Jewish dietary laws called Kashrut forbids the eating of shrimp. In Christianity, the King James version of the Old Testament states that it is acceptable to eat finfish, but shrimp are an abomination and should not be eaten. Finally, within the Islamic religion, the Shafi'i, Maliki, Hanbali and Ja'fari schools allow the eating of shrimp, while the Hanafi school does not.

Nutrition 

As with other seafood, shrimp is high in protein but low in food energy. A shrimp-based meal is also a significant source of cholesterol, from 122 mg to 251 mg per 100 g of shrimp, depending on the method of preparation. Shrimp consumption, however, is considered healthy for the circulatory system because the lack of significant levels of saturated fat in shrimp means that the high cholesterol content in shrimp actually improves the ratio of LDL to HDL cholesterol and lowers triglycerides.

Shrimp are high in levels of omega-3s (generally beneficial) and low in levels of mercury (generally toxic), with an FDA study in 2010 showing a level of 0.001 parts per million, analysing only methylmercury.

Preparation 

Preparing shrimp for consumption usually involves removing the head, shell, tail, and "sand vein".  A notable exception is drunken shrimp, a dish using freshwater shrimp that is often eaten alive, but immersed in ethanol to make consumption easier.

To shell a shrimp, the tail is held while gently removing the shell around the body. The tail can be detached completely at this point, or left attached for presentation purposes.

Although the head and shell are generally removed before consumption, they are edible when cooked.

Removing the "sand vein" (a euphemism for the digestive tract) is referred to as "deveining". The sand vein can be removed by making a shallow cut lengthwise down the outer curve of the shrimp's body, allowing the dark ribbon-like digestive tract to be removed with a pointed utensil. Special deveining tools are sometimes used but knives, skewers, and even toothpicks can be used to devein. Alternatively, if the tail has been detached, the vein can be pinched at the tail end and pulled out completely with the fingers. On large shrimp, the "blood vein" (a euphemism for the ventral nerve cord) along the inner curve of the shrimp's body is typically removed as well. The shrimp is then rinsed under cold running water. Removing the vein is not essential, as it is not poisonous and is mostly tasteless. Deveining does slightly change the flavor and makes it more consistent. Shrimp also sometimes consume small amounts of sand and the vein might thus be gritty.

Shrimp and prawns are versatile ingredients. Common methods of preparation include baking, boiling, frying, grilling and barbequing. They are as delicate as eggs with regard to cooking time. When they are overcooked, they have a tough and rubbery texture.

Recipes using shrimp form part of the cuisine of many cultures. Strictly speaking, dishes containing scampi should be made from the Norway lobster, a shrimp-like crustacean more closely related to the lobster than shrimp. Scampi is often called the "Dublin Bay prawn", and in some places it is quite common for other prawns to be used instead.

Wet shrimp is commonly used as a flavoring and as a soup base in Asian cuisines while fried shrimp is popular in North America. In Europe, shrimp is very popular, forming a necessary ingredient in Spanish , Italian , Portuguese  and many other seafood dishes. Shrimp curry is very popular in South Asia and Southeast Asia. Shrimp are also found in Latin and Caribbean dishes such as enchiladas and coconut shrimp. Other recipes include jambalaya, okonomiyaki, poon choi and bagoong. Shrimp are also consumed as salad, by frying, with rice, and as shrimp guvec (a dish baked in a clay pot) in the Western and Southern coasts of Turkey. In the subject of Japanese sushi, shrimp has long been valued as the "king of sushi-dane", as its composition can be either raw or cooked, and its latter preparation has often been considered a good introduction or choice for those unfamiliar to eating sushi, especially dishes involving raw fish.

Shrimp could also be fermented into shrimp paste in South East Asia and China.

Marketing 

Shrimp are marketed and commercialized with several issues in mind. Most shrimp are sold frozen and marketed based on their categorization of presentation, grading, colour and uniformity.

Shrimp dishes 

Many various dishes are prepared using shrimp as a primary ingredient.
Ebiko, or shrimp roe, sometimes translated as "shrimp flakes", is used as an ingredient in the preparation of sushi. There also exists popcorn shrimp, garlic butter shrimp, breaded or battered deep-fried small shrimp.

See also 

 Crayfish as food
 Culinary name
 Eating live seafood
 Fish as food
 Pain in crustaceans
 Seafood
 Shrimp fishery

References

External links 

Animal-based seafood
Decapods
 
Commercial crustaceans
Seafood
Meat by animal